, better known by the stage name , is a Japanese actress and singer employed by the talent management firm Stardust Promotion.

Filmography

Film
Karaoke Terror (2002)
Lost in Ramen (2018)

TV dramas
Nerawareta Gakuen (1982)
Asobi Janai yo, Kono Koi ha (1986)
Asunaro Hakusho (1993)
Daisuki! Itsutsuko series (1999–2009)
Influence (2021), Yoshiko Totsuka

Anime
Hiatari Ryōkō! (????) (Kasumi Kishimoto)
Kochira Katsushika-ku Kameari Kōen-mae Hashutsujo (????) (Katrina Reiko Akimoto)

Other
Hanamaru Market (????)
Osoku Okita Asa ha... → Osoku Okita Hiru ha... → Hayaku Okita Asa ha... (????)

References

External links
Yumi Morio Website (in Japanese)

1966 births
Living people
Japanese voice actresses
Japanese idols
People from Sōka
Stardust Promotion artists